is a Japanese football manga and anime series, authored by Yōichi Takahashi. The manga was serialized in Akita Shoten's shōnen manga magazine Weekly Shōnen Champion from January 2002 to February 2005, with its chapters collected in six tankōbon volumes. The anime series was animated by Nippon Animation and broadcast on Animax from September 2002 to September 2003, spanning a total of 52 episodes.

Storyline
Hungry Heart: Wild Striker tells the story of Kanō Kyōsuke, a teenage high school student who at the beginning of the series, has just transferred into Jyoyō Orange High School. Kyōsuke's older brother is the illustrious and extremely famous A.C. Milan football player, Kanō Seisuke, who had first taught him how to play and love the game of football and whom he has greatly admired since childhood. After Seisuke left Japan to sign with Italian powerhouse A.C. Milan, people started comparing Kyōsuke with his brother and criticizing him due to his different playing style. Living in his brother's shadow, Kyōsuke's love for the game slowly started to evaporate and lessen, and he eventually lost most of his passion for it.

After his transfer to Jyoyō and a fated meeting with Tsujiwaki Miki, an enthusiastic girl with a lot of passion for football and who soon reinvigorates his love for the game with her determination to excel, Kyōsuke's deep love and passion for football returns to its fullest. He soon joins the Jyoyō men's football team and makes several friends, such as his fellow freshmen, Sakai Jefferson, a talented goalkeeper, and Rodrigo, a passionate Brazilian transfer student. Kyōsuke, with the support of his friends at Jyoyō and invigorated with Miki's care and help and by his love and determination to excel in football, takes on the best, and discovers an immense and determined passion for the game.

Characters

Called Orangehead jokingly by some of his friends, Kyōsuke is a forward. He learned the ins and outs of football from his illustrious elder brother, A.C. Milan playmaker Kanō Seisuke. After Seisuke's departure, he slowly loses interest in the game, but rediscovers his love for it after a fated meeting with Miki. Initially the coach of Jyoyō's women's football team, the determination exhibited by the girls, especially Miki, invigorates his passion for football, and soon he joins Jyoyō's men's football team, emerging as their ace striker. In the last episode, he becomes a player for AFC Ajax.

Kyōsuke's closest friend, and the captain of the Jyoyō female football team. Despite their frequent fights, the two eventually fall in love with each other.

Rodrigo is a midfielder and transfer student from Brazil who wants to go pro in order to help his large family. While he appears to be cold, self-centered and only driven by money at first, his attitude radically changes after his meeting with Kyosuke. Rodrigo is Jyoyo's playmaker, who earns the interest of several professional J. League clubs. In the final year, he becomes the captain of Akanegaoka.

Sakai is the team's goalkeeper and a half-Japanese transfer student from Sweden, known for being attractive to women. Jyoyō's star goalkeeper learns to overcome his repressed fear of injury through his interactions with his new teammates. Sakai shares a strong bond with both Rodrigo and Kyosuke.

Kamata is plays foulback. He played forward in junior high but becomes Jyoyo's defensive leader and vice captain. Kyosuke often joking jabs at him, but respects Kamata deeply. Kamata also has a family who runs a ramen business and was visited by Kyosuke to convince his father to support him. Kamata is currently playing for a regional team and aiming for a spot in the J-League. 

Sako is the team's midfielder. Jyoyo's team captain and playmaker prior to Rodrigo's takeover. Sako is levelheaded, mentally quick and always willing to help his teammates. He has a rivalry with Ryosei's captain and genius playmaker Furuki during high school. He and Furuki end up being teammates in university.

Ichikawa is a midfielder known for his hot-headed attitude. In the first year, he has trouble with Rodrigo's individualist attitude, as he believes teamwork is the key for victory. In the second year, he is chosen to be vice captain and has to deal with Yūya and his group.

Esaka is a midfielder referred to as "Osaka" by Kyosuke. Esaka seems to take everything in stride and with a smile on his face. While appearing to be no more than comic relief, he is actually quite passionate about his teammates' well-being and the team's performance. He is selected to be Jyoyo's new captain by both Sako and Kamata, who both acknowledged his excellent attitude and drive to improve.

 
Kiba is a forward who only appears in the anime. Called "Nesthead" by Kyōsuke. Kyōsuke's rival during his second year for the forward position. He also falls in love with Miki and battles with Kyōsuke in order to win her heart. He is known for his speed and striking ability.

Shinkawa is a midfielder who only appears in the anime. He is the fastest member of the team and Yūya's close friend. He and Muroi joined football to help Yūya make it into the J-League as a way to thank him for getting them out of their lives as delinquents. He is known for his incredible speed and dribbling ability.

Muroi plays defense and only appears in the anime. He replaces Kamata in Kyosuke's second year as a defender and is known for his Mohawk hairstyle. Like Shinkawa, he started playing football to help Yūya make it into the J-League.

The coach of the Jyōyo men's football team.  He was formerly a powerful forward for the Japanese National Team.

Manager of the Jyōyo men's football team. He used to play football in middle school, but due to an injury cannot play anymore.

Jyōyo dormitory's cook.

Jyōyo's nutritionist and team doctor. She is Seisuke's girlfriend, who asked her to watch over his brother in his absence.

Kyōsuke's older brother. When he was younger, he led both his middle and high school's football teams to the nationals and won, and was in the top three in high school. A world-renowned player before 17, he also had a J. League contract before age 21, and later became the A.C. Milan star and captain. He also had excellent academic grades.
Akira Furuki

Ryosei's team captain. He plays ID (Important Data) football and later plays on the same college team as Sako.
Makoto Iguchi
Kokuryō's ace goalkeeper. He also plays with the Japan youth team.
Yūjirō Kamiyama

Kokuryō's ace striker. Kyōsuke's rival as the best striker in the region and a member of the Japan youth team.
 and 

The Fujimori brothers are known as Kokuryō's dynamic duo and are the team's midfielders. They are members of the Japan youth team.

He is Tenryū's captain and the team's midfielder. He becomes Kyōsuke's rival as the best player in high school football in Japan.

Like Jyōyo's coach Murakami, he was a former player for the national team. He was the first man to ever score a goal in a World Cup for Japan (in the 1998 World Cup, in Japan's final group stage game, a 1-2 loss to Jamaica), since this was their first time to play in the tournament.
Keisuke Narumi
Biological father of Kyosuke, who held a mark in Japanese football. Lost his life in a car accident shortly before being called to the Japan national football team. Kyosuke was in the car, but managed to survive the accident. He holds a record of scoring in the prefecture before Kyosuke broke it.
Mitsuko Narumi
Biological mother of Kyosuke. She lost her life in the car accident along with her husband.
Coach Numakawa
Head coach of Tenryu High and Japan Under 22 delegate.
Toda and Ueno
Both are side backs for Jyoyō. Kamata teaches them some defensive techniques in the first year. Sakai also tells them what to do in some trainings and matches.

Media

Manga
The series was planned by Yōichi Takahashi who wished to use the title of Bruce Springsteen's song "Hungry Heart" which he enjoyed. While developing the manga, Takahashi also contacted Nippon Animation to make an anime series at the same time. Despite being based on the Hungry Heart, Takahashi stated that the two would be highly different. The manga was serialized in Akita Shoten's shōnen manga magazine Weekly Shōnen Champion from January 24, 2002, to February 10, 2005. Akita Shoten collected its chapters in six tankōbon volumes, released from November 7, 2002, to April 8, 2005.

Volume list

Anime
A Hungry Heart anime series retitled Hungry Heart: Wild Striker was produced by Nippon Animation and Animax. Satoshi Saga directed the series while Ken'ichi Imaizumi was in charge of characters designs which were significantly different from the ones from the manga. The series aired in Japan in Animax between September 11, 2002 and September 10, 2003, spanning a total of 52 episodes. Pony Canyon collected the series in a total of thirteen DVD volumes released in Japan between February 19, 2003 and March 17, 2004. All of the DVD covers use color illustrations by Yōichi Takahashi.

The series uses two opening themes starting with Kids Alive's  "2nd Stage". In episode 40, Kokia's  serves as the new ending theme and it is used for the remaining episodes except the final one which uses "2nd Stage."

Episode list

Notes

References

External links
Nippon Animation's official website for Hungry Heart: Wild Striker 
Animax's official website for Hungry Heart: Wild Striker 
Animax East Asia's page for Hungry Heart
Animax South Asia's page for Hungry Heart

2002 anime television series debuts
2002 manga
Akita Shoten manga
Animax original programming
Association football in anime and manga
Nippon Animation
School life in anime and manga
Shōnen manga